Hyposmocoma suffusella is a species of moth of the family Cosmopterigidae. It was first described by Lord Walsingham in 1907. It is endemic to the Hawaiian islands of Molokai and Maui.

The larvae feed on Pipturus. The larva is known to be a case-maker.

External links

suffusella
Endemic moths of Hawaii
Biota of Molokai
Biota of Maui
Moths described in 1907
Taxa named by Thomas de Grey, 6th Baron Walsingham